The Rattlesnake Fire was a wildfire that burned  in Navajo and Greenlee Counties, in Arizona. The fire was detected on April 11, 2018, on the Fort Apache Indian Reservation and spread onto the San Carlos Indian Reservation and Apache-Sitgreaves National Forests over the following four days. Fanned by high winds, the Rattlesnake Fire spread rapidly until it was contained on May 1. The fire continued to burn within containment until May 27. No structures were damaged or destroyed by the fire, but 15 firefighters were injured. Investigators suspected the cause of the fire was human activity, but it was never determined with certainty.

Fire
Around 1:30 PM (MST) on April 11, 2018, a  fire was detected east of Rattlesnake Point, on the Fort Apache Indian Reservation in Navajo County, Arizona. High winds fed the Rattlesnake Fire and grounded firefighting aviation until April 14. The fire expanded into the San Carlos Indian Reservation the next day and then, on April 14, into the Bear Wallow Wilderness, in Greenlee County.

Firefighters were able to make substantial progress on April 22 due to improved weather, and estimated that the spread of the Rattlesnake Fire had been 25% contained. By April 24, high winds were again fanning the Rattlesnake Fire, which grew over to  the next day. It grew to its maximum extent——on May 1. Cooler, wetter weather aided firefighters in increasing the Rattlesnake Fire's containment to 82% by May 3. The fire continued to burn in containment until going out on May 27.

Aftermath
The Rattlesnake Fire burned  over 46 days in the Fort Apache Indian Reservation, San Carlos Indian Reservation, and Apache-Sitgreaves National Forests. More than 500 firefighters worked to contain and suppress the Rattlesnake Fire. Only  of the total burned area suffered severe foliage mortality and the burn scar was judged almost in its entirety to have not been severely burned. Containment and suppression of the Rattlesnake Fire cost $11.4 million. No structures were damaged or destroyed by the Rattlesnake Fire, but 15 firefighters were injured while working to contain its spread.

The United States Forest Service began investigating the cause of the Rattlesnake Fire on April 14, suspecting human activity. No definite cause was determined.

References

External links
 

April 2018 events in the United States
2018 Arizona wildfires
History of Navajo County, Arizona
History of Greenlee County, Arizona